Suicide tree may refer to at least two different plant species:

Cerbera odollam (native to India) so called because it is toxic
Tachigali versicolor (native to Central America) so called because it reproduces once before dying